Series 30+ (abbreviated as S30+) is a software platform and application user interface used for Nokia-branded mobile devices. The platform was introduced by Nokia in September 2013, first appearing on the Nokia 108, and has been the main Nokia feature phone operating system after the end of the Series 30 and Series 40 platforms in 2014. Despite the similar name and user interface, S30+ is technically completely different and unrelated to S30.

Many S30+ devices only support MAUI Runtime Environment, and application file (.vxp) developed by MediaTek, but some later devices have included support for J2ME applications. Even for models that don't support Java J2ME applications, some are still capable of running something. Some S30+ models also come with an online shop that would allow downloading new apps and games.

Some newer phone models with "Series 30+" platform are said to be based on RTOS.

List of devices
The following feature phones use the Series 30+ platform and are all available as both single and Dual SIM models.

Made by Nokia
 Nokia 108 released in 2013 is a Series 30+ based device with support for camera, video and Bluetooth technology.
 Nokia 220 was released in 2014 with 2.4-inch display and having Nokia Xpress browser and GPRS data connection (2.5G).
 Nokia 225, released in 2014, is similar to the 220 but has a larger 2.8-inch display.

Made by Microsoft
 Nokia 130 is a smaller device with a 1.8-inch display, also released in 2014.
 Nokia 215 was announced in January 2015. Like the 220, the 215 has a 2.4-inch display, has GPRS – EDGE connectivity and only has a VGA camera.
 Nokia 105 (2015) is a device announced in June 2015, it notably had increased storage and could store over 2.000 contacts and last 35 days on standby, and is advertised as a backup telephone for smartphone users.
Nokia 222 is a device announced in August 2015. The differentiation from its predecessors is that it comes with Skype's GroupMe application preinstalled, supports J2ME applications.
 Nokia 230 launched in November 2015. This device features front facing and main camera both with LED flash.
 Nokia 216 was announced in September 2016 and released in October 2016 (first released in India and Vietnam, later in the United Kingdom in January 2017). It is identical in features to the Nokia 215 with the main difference being the front facing camera and a slight redesign.
 Microsoft-branded phone with a part number RM-1182 was reportedly developed in 2015. Photos surfaced in 2018 showed a redesigned user interface, featuring elements of Windows 10 Mobile design language and Microsoft Account integration.

Made by HMD
 Nokia 150 was launched on 13 December 2016. It looks like a Nokia 216 but excludes a front camera and flash, uses a different processor, only has 6 ringtones in Tones, and has a matte finish around the keypad (as opposed to the glossy finish around the keypad on the Nokia 216). It still features Bluetooth, but lacks the ability to access the internet.
 Nokia 3310 (2017) in 2G was announced on 26 February 2017. The Series 30+ is integrated only on the 2G version.
 Nokia 105 (2017) was announced on 17 July 2017.
 Nokia 130 (2017) was announced on 17 July 2017.
 Nokia 106 (2018) was announced on 14 November 2018.
 Nokia 210 (2019) was announced on 25 February 2019.
 Nokia 105 (2019) was announced on 24 July 2019.
 Nokia 110 (2019) was announced on 5 September 2019.
Nokia 5310 (2020) was announced on 19 March 2020.
 Nokia 125 was announced on 12 May 2020.
 Nokia 150 (2020) was announced on 12 May 2020.
 Nokia 215 4G (2020) was announced on 10 October 2020.
 Nokia 225 4G (2020) was announced on 10 October 2020.
 Nokia 6310 (2021) was announced on 26 July 2021.
 Nokia 105 (2022) was announced on 26 March 2022
 Nokia 110 (2022) was announced on 26 March 2022
 Nokia 105 Plus (2022) on 26 April 2022 in India
 Nokia 5710 XpressAudio (2022) was released on 12 July 2022. Unlike Nokia's other phones, this model contains a pair of wireless earbuds, dedicated music playback buttons, and wireless FM radio.
 Nokia 8210 4G (2022)
 Nokia 2660 Flip (2022)

Multimedia support
Maximum accepted video resolution is 854×480.
 Accepted video containers: AVI, MP4, 3GP and 3G2.
 Accepted video codecs: DivX 4, DivX 5, XviD, H.263, H.264, MPEG-4 and MJPEG.
 Accepted audio containers and codecs: MP3, WAV (PCM and ADPCM variants only), AAC, AAC+ (poor), eAAC+ (poor), AMR-NB, MIDI (no larger than 20 KB for old versions)
 Accepted photo formats: JPEG, GIF, PNG, BMP

See also
 Series 20
 Series 30
 Series 40
 Series 60
 Series 80
 Series 90

References

Nokia platforms
Mobile software
Mobile operating systems
Embedded operating systems